Jesús Edgardo Lucero Vázquez is a paralympic athlete from Mexico competing mainly in category F20 javelin events.

Jesus competed in the 2000 Summer Paralympics winning a silver medal in the F20 javelin.

References

Paralympic athletes of Mexico
Athletes (track and field) at the 2000 Summer Paralympics
Paralympic silver medalists for Mexico
Living people
Medalists at the 2000 Summer Paralympics
Year of birth missing (living people)
Paralympic medalists in athletics (track and field)
Mexican male javelin throwers